The following is a list of Chinese television programs by date of first broadcast in China.

1970s

1978
1 January  - Xinwen Lianbo

1980s

1983
12 February - CCTV New Year's Gala
Outlaws of the Marsh

1984
Black Cat Detective

1985
Ji Gong
Zhuge Liang

1986
1 October - Journey to the West

1987
Calabash Brothers
Dream of the Red Chamber

1990s

1990
Kewang
Tang Ming Huang
The Investiture of the Gods

1991
The Three Heroes and Five Gallants

1993
I Love My Family

1994
The Book and the Sword
Romance of the Three Kingdoms

1995
9 January - Sinful Debt
The Blue Mouse and the Big Faced Cat
Wu Zetian

1996
16 March - Tell It Like It Is
A Romance in Shanghai

1997
7 July - Happy Camp
A Sentimental Story

1998
January - The Water Margin
1 June - Approaching Science
December - Shangguan Wan'er
A Date with Luyu
Han Liu Bang
My Fair Princess

1999
8 October - 3000 Whys of Blue Cat
The Eloquent Ji Xiaolan
Yongzheng Dynasty

2000s

2000
30 March - Palace of Desire
10 July - The Taiping Heavenly Kingdom
Sun Zi Bing Fa Yu San Shi Liu Ji
Sunny Piggy

2001
June - Master Swordsman Lu Xiaofeng
June - Master Swordsman Lu Xiaofeng 2
9 July - Lecture Room
December - Kangxi Dynasty
The Prince of Han Dynasty
Huo Yuanjia
Into the Shangri-La
Jingwu Yingxiong Chen Zhen
Laughing in the Wind
Legendary Fighter: Yang's Heroine
Li Wei the Magistrate
Love Legend of the Tang Dynasty
Music Up
Romance in the Rain
Qin Shi Huang

2002
1 January - Ode to Gallantry
1 January - World Film Report
2 December - The Great Qing Empire
25 December - The Heaven Sword and Dragon Saber
GG Bond
Love Through Different Times
Only You
Qianlong Dynasty
Shaolin King of Martial Arts
Sky Lovers
The Young Wong Fei Hung
Drunken Hero
Book and Sword, Gratitude and Revenge

2003
20 March - The Story of a Noble Family
April - Towards the Republic
12 August - A Leaf in the Storm
18 September - Flying Daggers
20 September - High Flying Songs of Tang Dynasty
23 September - The Imperfect Sculpture
22 December  - Demi-Gods and Semi-Devils
Affair of Half a Lifetime
The Affaire in the Swing Age
Boy & Girl
Eternity: A Chinese Ghost Story
The Legend of the Condor Heroes
My Fair Princess III
The Showroom Tales
The Story of Han Dynasty
Travelogue
Xiaozhuang Mishi
The Story of Han Dynasty

2004
6 May - Super Girl
1 July - Lian Cheng Jue
6 August - Amazing Detective Di Renjie
10 October - The Legend of Guan Gong
Assassinator Jing Ke
Genghis Khan
Jin Mao Xiang
Li Wei the Magistrate II
Ma Dashuai
Magic Touch of Fate
The Proud Twins
Warriors of the Yang Clan
Amor de Tarapaca 
Huang Taizi Mishi

2005
2 January - The Emperor in Han Dynasty
30 January - The Royal Swordsmen
31 January - Chinese Paladin
12 February - Home with Kids
August - Pleasant Goat and Big Big Wolf
August - How Much Sorrow Do You Have 
4 October - Lotus Lantern
5 October - Trail of the Everlasting Hero
23 October - Moment in Peking
16 December - The Dragon Heroes
The 100th Bride
The Dreaming Girl
Li Wei Resigns from Office
The Little Fairy
Lost City in Snow Heaven
The Prince of Qin, Li Shimin
The River Flows Eastwards
SkyEye
Taizu Mishi
Magic Touch of Fate

2006
9 January - The Lucky Stars
13 February - Qiao's Grand Courtyard
17 March - The Return of the Condor Heroes
26 March - Sigh of His Highness 
28 March - To Live to Love
March - Seven Swordsmen
9 May - Sound of Colors 
10 May - Century Sonny
2 July - Paris Sonata
16 August - Fast Track Love
30 August - Princess Der Ling
4 September - Da Qing Fengyun
31 October - The Great Dunhuang
22 September - Chuanqi Huangdi Zhu Yuanzhang
26 September - The Young Warriors
30 September - Emerald on the Roof
18 November - Interviews Before Execution
20 November - Amazing Detective Di Renjie 2
24 December - Soldiers Sortie
29 November - Secret History of Kangxi
December - The Rise of the Tang Empire
The Adventures of Little Carp
How Much Sorrow Do You Have
Eight Charts
Eight Heroes
Founding Emperor of Ming Dynasty
Go Player
Initiating Prosperity
Silent Tears
Star Boulevard
Tortoise Hanba's Stories
Wanderings of Sanmao
Wu Zi Bei Ge
Romance of Red Dust

2007
10 January - The Great Revival
10 January - The Legend of Lu Xiaofeng
25 January - Shanghai Bund
27 January - Carol of Zhenguan
1 February - Sword Stained with Royal Blood
February - The Legend and the Hero
17 May - Struggle
25 May - Super Boy
25 June - Love at First Fight
13 July - Thank You for Having Loved Me
5 August - The Shadow of Empress Wu
18 August - Da Tang Fu Rong Yuan
29 September - Who Wants to Be a Millionaire?
26 October - Beautiful Life
7 December - The Legend of Chu Liuxiang
11 December - Ming Dynasty
Butterfly Lovers
King Qian in Wuyue
The Legend of Qin
Ming Dynasty in 1566
The Olympic Adventures of Fuwa
The Rebirth of a King
The Fairies of Liaozhai

2008
13 January - China's Next Top Model
22 February - The Last Princess
5 March - 1 vs. 100
15 March - Amazing Detective Di Renjie 3
3 April - Ren Bishi
5 May - Royal Tramp
May - A Mobile Love Story
18 July - The Legend of the Condor Heroes
24 July - Paladins in Troubled Times
4 August - Day Day Up
12 October - The Legend of Bruce Lee
3 November - The Shaolin Warriors
6 November - Taiwan 1895
15 November - Ai Chang Cai Hui Ying
Modern Lady

2009
12 January - Dali Princess
22 January - Rose Martial World
26 January - Stage of Youth
31 January - The Legend and the Hero 2
5 March - My Chief and My Regiment
14 March - Love in a Fallen City
20 March - The Book and the Sword
12 April - My Youthfulness
14 April - Prelude of Lotus Lantern
1 May - I'm a Boss
2 June - The Road We Have Taken
28 June - Chinese Paladin 3
13 July - Nonstop
20 July - Love in Sun Moon Lake
22 July - Justice Bao
26 July - In That Distant Place
8 August - Meteor Shower
23 August - IPartment
6 October - Ancestral Temple
23 October - The Heaven Sword and Dragon Saber
30 November - Baike Quan Shuo
December - Bing Sheng
December- The Qin Empire
Dwelling Narrowness
Zheng He Xia Xiyang
Lurk

2010s

2010
2 January - The Myth
10 January - Sinful Debt 2
14 February - Journey to the West
10 March - The Patriotic Knights
15 March - Beauty's Rival in Palace
24 March - Run Daddy Run
3 April - Will You Marry Me and My Family
2 May - Three Kingdoms
27 May - Huang Yanpei 
4 June - The Girl in Blue
July - Wu Cheng'en and Journey to the West
14 August - A Weaver on the Horizon 
15 August - Ancient Legends
17 September - Single Princesses and Blind Dates 
6 July - The Dream of Red Mansions
10 October - Happy Mother-in-Law, Pretty Daughter-in-Law 
27 December - The Legend of Crazy Monk
Mad Detective Di Renjie
Justice Bao

2011
1 January - The Vigilantes in Masks 
2 January - Kong Que Ling
31 January - Palace
2 February - Melody of Youth
9 February - Sunny Happiness
3 March - Painted Skin
4 May - All Men Are Brothers
16 July - New My Fair Princess
28 July - Journey to the West
8 August - Twin of Brothers
27 September - 1911 Revolution
21 October - Beauty World
5 November - Secret History of Empress Wu
10 September - Scarlet Heart
30 September - The Glamorous Imperial Concubine
17 November - Ad Mania
17 November - Empresses in the Palace
17 December - The Han Triumph
The Holy Pearl
Unruly Qiao 
Invincible Knights Errant

2012
8 January - Beijing Love Story
20 January - Palace 2
27 March - Secret History of Princess Taiping
14 May - A Bite of China
14 June - The Legend of Chu Liuxiang
6 July - Xuan-Yuan Sword: Scar of Sky
8 August - The Bachelor
27 August - When Love Walked In 
14 September - The Bride with White Hair
3 November - Drama Go! Go! Go!
28 December - King's War
31 December - Mazu
The Queen of SOP 
Su Dongpo

2013
14 January - Heroes in Sui and Tang Dynasties
6 February - Swordsman'
24 February - Ip Man5 May - Legend of Lu Zhen4 July - The Patriot Yue Fei13 July - The Legend of Chasing Fish6 August - Flowers in Fog14 August - Prince of Lan Ling24 August - Women of the Tang Dynasty14 September - La ma zheng zhuan (Hot mom)11 October - Where Are We Going, Dad?23 October - Fiancee 
27 October - 2 Days & 1 Night3 December - Heroes of Sui and Tang Dynasties 
20 November - Best Time22 December - The Demi-Gods and Semi-Devils25 December - Mao ZedongDestiny by LoveSee Without LookingSleek Rat, the ChallengerThe Qin Empire II: Alliance2014
5 January - Cao Cao28 January - Heroes of Sui and Tang Dynasties31 January - The Investiture of the Gods 
7 April - Palace 321 April - Perfect Couple22 April - Scarlet Heart 224 April - Dad is Back 
3 June - Young Sherlock23 June - Loving, Never Forgetting23 June - One and a Half Summer2 July - Swords of Legends 
6 July - Go, Single Lady7 July - Boss & Me14 July - Battle of Changsha10 August - Love at Second SightAugust - Deng Xiaoping at History's Crossroads8 September - Marriage Cuisine1 October - Sound of the Desert10 October - Hurry Up, Brother17 October  - The Amazing Race China17 October - Grade One12 November - Top Gear3 December - The Romance of the Condor Heroes20 December - The Deer and the Cauldron 
21 December - The Empress of China25 December - Monopoly ExposureRed SorghumMoment in PekingThe Stand-In2015
10 January - My Sunshine28 January - Lady & Liar4 February - Legend of Fragrance15 February - Love Weaves Through a Millennium19 February - Where Are We Going, Dad? 2 
3 March - Cruel Romance15 March - Sisters Over Flowers17 March - The Four21 March - I Supermodel25 April - Divas Hit the Road1 May - Takes a Real Man 
3 May - Tiger Mom9 June - The Journey of Flower6 July - Wu Xin: The Monster Killer12 June - The Lost Tomb14 June - Go Fighting!22 July - Diamond Lover24 July - Real Hero1 August - Up Idol31 August - The Disguiser13 September - Love Yunge from the Desert19 September - Nirvana in Fire21 September - Challenger's Alliance22 September - Legend of Zu Mountain15 October - Love Me If You Dare6 November - Run for Time29 November - The Substitute30 November - The Legend of Mi Yue3 December - Go Fridge6 December - Infinite ChallengeDecember - Go Princess Go2016
11 January - Mad About You22 January - Twenty-Four Hours29 January - Addicted1 February - Chronicle of Life1 February - Rocket of China8 February - Legend of Nine Tails Fox13 February - The Imperial Doctress17 February - The Three Heroes and Five Gallants 
27 March - Who's the Murderer3 April - God of War, Zhao Yun18 April - Ode to Joy24 April - My Amazing Boyfriend27 April - Magical Space-time23 May - Chinese Paladin 524 May - Dear Translator31 May - To Be a Better Man19 June - Heroes of Remix20 June - The Mystic Nine25 June - The Legend of Beggar King and Big Foot Queen8 July - The Amazing Race China 315 July - Sing! China20 July - Novoland: The Castle in the Sky20 July - The Whirlwind Girl 221 July - Singing All Along24 July - Ice Fantasy31 July - Noble Aspirations22 August - Just One Smile Is Very Alluring18 September - Mask Singer20 September - Housing24 October - When a Snail Falls in LoveOctober - Medical Examiner Dr. QinNovember 7 - P. King Duckling11 November - The Princess Weiyoung11 December - Stay with Me21 November - Number One Surprise8 December - Noble Aspirations 219 December - Candle in the TombAngel WingsBloodivoresCheating CraftFresh Sunday2017
2 January - Pretty Li Hui Zhen3 January - General and I9 January - The Legend of the Condor Heroes12 January - Chōyū Sekai21 January - Singer201730 January - Eternal Love6 February - The Starry Night, The Starry Sea8 March - Ice Fantasy Destiny27 March - Stitch & Ai28 March In the Name of People1 April - The Silver Guardian14 April - Surgeons 
17 April - Fighter of the Destiny24 April - Operation Love11 May - Ode to Joy 25 June - Princess AgentsJuly - A Life Time LoveJuly - Lost Love in TimesThe Qin Empire III 18 December Nirvana in Fire 22018
January King of Bots 27 April Marx Got It Right 14 August - The Rise of Phoenixes 20 August - Ruyi's Royal Love in the Palace Upcoming Tribes and Empires: Storm of ProphecyRush to the Dead SummerXuan-Yuan Sword Legend: The Clouds of HanThe Weasel Grave Liang Sheng, Can We Not Be SadOnly Side by Side with You''

See also
List of Chinese television series
List of Japanese television programs by date

References

Lists of Chinese television series
Television in China by year